Uranienborg can be:

Uranienborg, Norway
Uraniborg (or Uranienborg), the astronomical/astrological observatory of Tycho Brahe on the island of Hven.